Andrea Strnadová defeated Meredith McGrath in the final, 6–2, 6–3 to win the girls' singles tennis title at the 1989 Wimbledon Championships.

Seeds

  Jo-Anne Faull (third round)
  Carrie Cunningham (third round)
  Amanda Coetzer (quarterfinals)
  Jennifer Capriati (quarterfinals)
  Cathy Caverzasio (second round)
  Meredith McGrath (final)
  Eva Švíglerová (third round)
  Kim Kessaris (quarterfinals)
  Silvia Farina (third round)
  Cristina Tessi (quarterfinals)
  Sam Smith (first round)
  Yael Segal (third round)
 n/a
  Sandrine Testud (second round)
  Michelle Anderson (semifinals)
  Naoko Sawamatsu (semifinals)

Draw

Finals

Top half

Section 1

Section 2

Bottom half

Section 3

Section 4

References

External links

Girls' Singles
Wimbledon Championship by year – Girls' singles